Ruth Chao (born in 1988) is a creative director and graphic artist in Hong Kong.  She has been awarded Prestige's 40 under 40 and Perspective’s 40 under 40. She is an Ambassador of Design of Hong Kong, and participated on a team that won the Berlin Red Dot Awards.

Early life and education 
Chao was born in 1988 in Hong Kong. 

She earned a Bachelor's degree in Psychology from the University of Bristol.

Career 
Chao started her career at British Vogue. She was trained by Robin Derrick and the now-Creative Director Jaime Perlman. When she returned to Hong Kong, she worked at Lane Crawford and I.T Apparels, where she designed for multiple brands and institutions. She has worked for Maison Margiela, Stella McCartney, and The Met Gala.  

In 2014, Chao and her partner, Antonia Li, co-founded INDICUBE, a creative agency based in Hong Kong. As Creative Director, Chao focuses on brand identity, graphic / website design and development. 

Chao has won several international design awards.

References 

1988 births
Living people
21st-century Hong Kong women
Chinese women company founders
Hong Kong women in business